The Juries Act 1825, also known as the County Juries Act, was an Act of the United Kingdom Parliament. It extends only to England and Wales.

Selected clauses

Qualifying for jury service
The following requirements qualified an individual for jury service (section 1):
 Male
 Between 21 and 60 years old
 At least one of:
 Owning land worth at least £10 a year if rented
 Having a lease of at least 21 years length of land with an annual rental value of at least £20
 Being a householder paying the poor rate on a property that has at least fifteen windows and an annual rental value of at least £30 (Middlesex) or £20 (elsewhere in England)

The requirement in the Bill of Rights 1689 that jurors in cases of high treason be freeholders was abolished.

In Wales the qualifications were scaled to three-fifths of the above values.

Exemptions from jury service
Various groups were exempted from jury service by section 2:
 Peers of the realm
 Judges
 Church of England clergy
 Roman Catholic priests
 Persons whose only occupation was as a protestant preacher (or preacher and schoolmaster)
 Practising lawyers
 Officers of the courts
 Coroners
 Jailers
 Physicians and surgeons
 Apothecaries
 Officers of the Army and Royal Navy
 Maritime pilots
 Staff of the Royal Household
 Officers of HM Customs and Excise
 High sheriffs, high constables
 Parish clerks

Juries restricted to British subjects only
Service on a jury was restricted to natural born subjects of the Crown by section 3.

Special juries

Section 31 listed qualification for service on special juries. They were required to be one of:
 A person entitled to be addressed as esquire
 A person of 'higher degree' (i.e. upper class)
 A banker
 A merchant

Juries de medietate linguae

Section 47 reiterated that foreigners were entitled to have one-half of a jury judging them to consist of fellow foreigners. Those foreign jurors had to be available in the area where the trial was held, but were otherwise exempted from the qualifications required of jurors at the time (such as owing land).

In force
Only section 29 remains in force. It requires challenges by the Crown to the composition of juries to only be made for cause.

References

Juries